The 1856 Philadelphia mayoral election saw the election of Richard Vaux.

Results

References

1856
Philadelphia
Philadelphia mayoral
19th century in Philadelphia